The Brunswick star is an emblem which in outline is an eight-pointed or sixteen-pointed star, but which is composed of many narrow rays. It is used in the United Kingdom to surround the royal cypher on various badges, such as that worn on the caps and helmets of almost all police and fire services in England and Wales. The name Brunswick refers to the German Duchy of Brunswick-Lüneburg, better known as the principality of Hanover, which was ruled by the House of Hanover whose heads also became kings of Great Britain.

Users
 Coldstream Guards
 Estonian Rescue Board and Häirekeskus
 Federal Police of Germany and various State Police Forces
 Guyana Defence Force
 Irish Guards
 Jamaica Defence Force
 Lithuanian Police Force
 National Police of Ukraine and the Ministry of Internal Affairs of Ukraine
 National Police Corps of Spain
 Netherlands Marine Corps
 Policja
 The Royal Regiment of Canada
 Scots Guards
 South African Police Service (formerly South African Police)
 South Australian Country Fire Service
 Zimbabwe Republic Police

Former
 Customs and Excise Department (Hong Kong) – before 1997
 The Dutch police both municipal and state police – until 1 April 1993
 Kulangsu Municipal Police – until 1943
 Shanghai Volunteer Corps and Municipal Police – until 1942
 Volkspolizei – until 1990

References

Star symbols
Heraldic charges